The  Dhola-Sadiya Bridge, officially known as Bhupen Hazarika Bridge, commonly known as the is a beam bridge in India, connecting the northeast states of Assam and Arunachal Pradesh. The bridge spans the Lohit River, a major tributary of the Brahmaputra, connecting the village of Dhola in the south to the village of Sadiya to the north, both in Tinsukia district of Assam, and providing convenient access to Arunachal Pradesh, whose border lies a short distance from Sadiya. The bridge is the first permanent road connection between the northern Assam and eastern Arunachal Pradesh.

At  in length, it is the longest bridge in India over water. However, the  Kacchi Dargah–Bidupur Bridge under construction in the Indian state of Bihar is expected to become the longest bridge in India upon its estimated completion in July 2023.

With rapid movement of India's defense assets in mind following incursions by the Chinese Army, the Dhola–Sadiya Bridge has been designed to handle the weight of  tanks such as the Indian Army's Arjun and T-72 main battle tanks. Since the Sino-Indian War, China has disputed India's claim to Arunachal Pradesh, politically and militarily, along the Line of Actual Control, making the bridge an important tactical asset in the ongoing dispute.

Construction  
The Ministry of Road Transport and Highways started a feasibility study of the project in August 2003 after demands from local constituents. In January 2009, the bridge was approved for construction with funding from the Government of India as part of the Arunachal Pradesh Package of Roads and Highways.

Construction began in November 2011 as a public-private partnership with Navayuga Engineering Company, with an expected completion in 2015. However, due to construction delays and cost increases, the bridge's completion date was pushed into 2017.

It is  longer than the Bandra Worli Sea Link in Mumbai, making it the longest bridge in India.

The bridge was inaugurated on 26 May 2017 by Indian Prime Minister Narendra Modi and Nitin Gadkari (Minister of Road Transport and Highways). The bridge is named after Bhupen Hazarika an artist and filmmaker from Assam.

Landscape

See also
 List of bridges on Brahmaputra River
List of longest bridges in the world
List of longest bridges above water in India

References

External links

Dhola–Sadiya Bridge

Bridges in Assam
Bridges in Arunachal Pradesh
Bridges over the Brahmaputra River
Memorials to Bhupen Hazarika
Transport in Tinsukia
Road bridges in India